Mariusz Piekarski (born 22 March 1975) is a Polish former professional footballer who played as a midfielder.

Career
Born in Białystok, Piekarski moved to Brazil with fellow countryman Krzysztof Nowak in 1996 to play for Atlético Paranaense. After one year, he joined Flamengo where he stayed for five months, also playing for Mogi Mirim before returning to Europe.

He retired in 2002 after an ankle injury sustained in a match for Anorthosis Famagusta, also suffering two cruciate ligaments injuries in his knees before. After retirement, he worked as an agent and intermediated the transfer of Roger Guerreiro and Edson to Poland.

In 2003, he was charged with bigamy after marrying a second wife before he was legally divorced from former Miss Brasil Kelley Vieira, who he met when playing in the South American country.

He played twice for Poland in friendly matches, making his debut in a 4–0 loss to Paraguay in 1998 and his second and final appearance as a starter in a 2–1 win against Faroe Islands.

Honours
Legia Warsaw
 Polish Champion: 2002
 Ekstraklasa Cup: 2002

Anorthosis Famagusta
 Cypriot Cup: 2003

References

External links
 
 
 

1975 births
Living people
Sportspeople from Białystok
Association football midfielders
Polish footballers
Poland international footballers
Jagiellonia Białystok players
Polonia Gdańsk players
Zagłębie Lubin players
Polish expatriate footballers
Ekstraklasa players
Ligue 1 players
Cypriot First Division players
Club Athletico Paranaense players
CR Flamengo footballers
Mogi Mirim Esporte Clube players
SC Bastia players
Legia Warsaw players
Anorthosis Famagusta F.C. players
Expatriate footballers in Brazil
Expatriate footballers in France
Expatriate footballers in Cyprus